Once and Forever is a 1927 American silent drama film directed by Phil Goldstone and starring Patsy Ruth Miller, John Harron and Burr McIntosh.

The film's sets were designed by the art director George Sawley.

Cast
 Patsy Ruth Miller as Antoinette 
 John Harron as Georges 
 Burr McIntosh as Governor 
 Emily Fitzroy as Katherine 
 Adele Watson as Henriette 
 Vadim Uraneff as Axel

References

Bibliography
 Munden, Kenneth White. The American Film Institute Catalog of Motion Pictures Produced in the United States, Part 1. University of California Press, 1997.

External links
 

1927 films
1927 drama films
1920s English-language films
American silent feature films
Silent American drama films
Films directed by Phil Goldstone
American black-and-white films
Tiffany Pictures films
1920s American films